Boparai pind() called just Boparai is a village in Phillaur tahsil of Jalandhar district of Punjab state of India.
Boparai comes under the goraya development block of Jalandhar.

Punjab, India
Jalandhar district